Lansky Brothers (better known as Lansky's) is a clothier in Memphis, Tennessee. It has gained worldwide recognition for being the choice location to buy clothes for musicians including Roy Orbison, Isaac Hayes, and Elvis Presley.

History 

Guy Lansky founded a shop at 126 Beale Street in the late forties. Guy later brought his younger brother, Bernard into the business. Originally a store which sold leftover Army supplies from World War II, Guy and Bernard took advantage of the elevating Beale Street music scene and looked to provide clothing for the typical characters of Beale who wanted to dress dapper. After a few years of business, Lansky Bros. already had an impressive list of customers, among them being Count Basie, Lionel Hampton, Duke Ellington and B.B. King.

At the start of 1952, Bernard and Guy noticed a young man who would continuously walk past his window and look inside, but never actually came inside to buy anything. Eventually, Guy  went to invite the man in. It was seventeen-year-old Elvis Presley, who worked at the local Loew's Theatre. According to Guy, Elvis told the brothers that he was going to buy him out when he got enough money. According to the historical marker on Beale Street in Memphis, Guy Lansky responded: "Elvis, don't buy me, buy from me!" Once Elvis became an international superstar, Lansky Brothers provided much of his attire, including his outfit for his first appearance on The Ed Sullivan Show in 1956. "I put Elvis in his first suit, and I put him in his last," Lansky recalls.

In 2001, Lansky's established a new line of clothing entitled "Clothier To The King," which provides reproductions of clothing that Elvis actually wore combined with new 1950s-inspired clothing. At some point, Lansky Brothers moved from its original location at 126 Beale Street to Memphis' renowned Peabody Hotel. It subsequently re-opened a second location at 126 Beale Street inside the Hard Rock Cafe complex in July 2014 Musicians who currently shop there include The Jonas Brothers, Robert Plant, Eddie Floyd, Stephen Stills, Steven Tyler, Dr. John, Gavin DeGraw.

In 2001, Lansky Bros. unveiled a historical marker at 126 Beale St. to celebrate the history of Lansky Bros. at the original location.

Guy died on January 5, 2004. According to his granddaughter, he died of Alzheimer’s disease. 

Bernard died on November 15, 2012. According to his sister, he died of Alzheimer's disease too.

References

External links
Interview with Bernard Lansky

Clothing retailers of the United States
Companies based in Memphis, Tennessee